Rulli is the surname of the following people:
Francesco Rulli, Italian businessman, philanthropist and judo instructor
Gerónimo Rulli (born 1992), Argentine football goalkeeper 
Lino Rulli (born 1971), American radio host, author, producer, and television host
Michael Rulli, American state senator of Ohio
Sebastián Rulli (born 1975), Argentine actor and model